The 2012 Oceania Junior Athletics Championships were held at the Barlow Park in Cairns, Australia, between June 27–29, 2012.  They were held together with the 2012 Oceania Open Championships.

A total of 35 events were contested, 18 by men and 17 by women.
For the first time, the new regional "East–West" format applies with medals
awarded to athletes from both the Eastern and the Western Region by
separating the results correspondingly.

Athletics Northern Territory and Athletics North Queensland sent a Combined "North Australia" Team including athletes who have not been chosen in the official Australian Team.

Complete results can be found on the webpages of Oceania Athletics Association of Queensland Athletics, and of the World Junior Athletics History.

Regional Division East

Medal summary

Boys under 20 (Junior) East

Girls under 20 (Junior) East

Medal Table East (unofficial)

Participation East (unofficial)
An unofficial count yields the number of about 44 athletes from 10 countries:

 (2)
 (3)
 (7)
 (7)
 (16)
 (1)
 (2)
 (2)
 (3)
 (1)

Regional Division West

Medal summary

Boys under 20 (Junior) West

Girls under 20 (Junior) West

Medal Table West (unofficial)

Participation West (unofficial)
An unofficial count yields the number of about 94 athletes from 8 countries. In addition, a combined North Australia team including athletes from the Northern Territory and North Queensland participated. 

 (16)
 (11)
 (4)
 (5)
 (5)
 (13)
 (5)
 (2)
/ North Australia (33)

References

External links
Oceania Athletics - Results

Oceania Junior Athletics Championships
International athletics competitions hosted by Australia
Oceanian Junior Championships
2012 in Australian sport
Youth sport in Australia
2012 in youth sport
June 2012 sports events in Australia